Capsicum minimum can refer to:

Capsicum minimum Mill., a synonym of Capsicum annuum L.
Capsicum minimum Roxb., a synonym of Capsicum frutescens L.